Keith Morris (born September 18, 1955) is an American singer and songwriter known for his role as frontman of the hardcore punk bands Black Flag, Circle Jerks, and Off!. Born and raised in Hermosa Beach, California, he formed Black Flag at the age of 21 with guitarist Greg Ginn and performed on the band's 1979 debut EP Nervous Breakdown. Shortly after leaving Black Flag in 1979, he formed the Circle Jerks with guitarist Greg Hetson; the band released seven albums between 1980 and 1995 and have broken up and reformed on numerous occasions. In 2009 Morris formed the supergroup Off! with guitarist Dimitri Coats, bassist Steven Shane McDonald, and drummer Mario Rubalcaba. Morris has also appeared as a guest vocalist on several albums by other artists.

Biography

Early life

Morris was born September 18, 1955 and grew up in Hermosa Beach, California. His father, Jerry, had been a budding jazz drummer in his youth and practiced with visiting jazz groups at the Lighthouse Café. Jerry later opened a bait shop in the 1970s and struck up a friendship with jazz record producer Ozzie Cadena (both men's sons, Keith and Dez, later became singers in Black Flag). Keith attended Mira Costa High School, where brothers Greg and Raymond Ginn were also students, and graduated in 1973. He then studied fine art and painting at the Pasadena Arts Center while working at his father's bait shop. One of his co-workers at the shop was Bill Stevenson, a Mira Costa student eight years Morris' junior who would also go on to be a member of Black Flag.

Morris and his friends spent their spare time hanging out by the Strand under Hermosa Beach pier, where they took drugs: "I'd get off work, and we'd get up to trouble," he later recalled, "smoking angel dust, snorting elephant tranquilizers. Just real goofy, 'why-would-you-want-to-do-that?' kinda stuff, the kind of thing you get up to when you're young, and into experimenting. If it was a good experience, then cool; if not, well, then it was just a real hard lesson learned." His early musical tastes included various rock acts such as Bob Seger, Foreigner, Montrose, Styx, Deep Purple, Black Sabbath, Queen, Ten Years After, Status Quo, Uriah Heep, UFO, the Scorpions, Aerosmith, Ted Nugent, and the MC5, "any kind of fist-pumping, 'flick-your-bic' rock. I was into anything that was loud". He became a freely opinionated and passionate fan of heavy rock and protopunk, and took a job working at local record store Rubicon Records.

Black Flag
In 1976, Morris co-founded Black Flag (then-known as Panic) along with guitarist Greg Ginn. Their work ethic proved too challenging for some early members; Ginn and  Morris had an especially hard time finding a reliable bass guitarist, and often rehearsed without a bassist, a factor that contributed to the development of Ginn's distinctive, often low-pitched guitar sound. The band went through three bass players before Chuck Dukowski joined and then Robo answered a Pennysaver ad and became their drummer.

After a number of line-up changes, Morris recorded vocals for the first Black Flag EP Nervous Breakdown. After two years in the band, Morris left the band citing, among other reasons, creative differences with Ginn, and his own "freaking out on cocaine and speed."

Circle Jerks
After leaving Black Flag in 1979, Morris founded the Circle Jerks, along with former Redd Kross guitarist Greg Hetson. Cited as one of the most important hardcore punk groups, the Circle Jerks were active until 1990, when Hetson left the band to continue playing guitar and release a number of albums with Bad Religion. The Circle Jerks reunited in 1994 and released their last studio album to date in 1995. The group performed on and off until 2011, when they went back on hiatus. In November 2019, plans were announced for a 2020 reunion tour in support of the 40th anniversary of their 1980 album, Group Sex, however the tour was postponed until September 2021 due to the COVID-19 pandemic. In April 2022, six of the dates on their 40th anniversary tour were postponed due to Morris testing positive for the COVID-19 virus.

Off!
As of 2010, Morris has been performing and touring with his latest project Off!, which he founded with Dimitri Coats from Burning Brides, Steven Shane McDonald from Redd Kross, and Mario Rubalcaba from Earthless/Rocket From The Crypt/Hot Snakes.

Morris stated in a March 2011 interview that Off! was asked to open future dates for the Red Hot Chili Peppers and they said they would even though it might anger some of their younger punk fans. Ultimately, Off! ended up not touring with Red Hot Chili Peppers. Morris has known the band for over 30 years and the Circle Jerks had performed shows with the Chili Peppers in the 80s. The Chili Peppers had also covered Black Flag and the Circle Jerks during their shows. Chili Peppers singer, Anthony Kiedis, wore an Off! hat at every show on the band's entire I'm with You World Tour including some of their music videos. Morris even filled in for Kiedis during one of the Chili Peppers' shows in 1984. When Kiedis, who was off scoring drugs, failed to show up for the performance, the band asked Morris to fill in on vocals. Morris, who didn't know any of the lyrics, yelled and made up lyrics to the band's songs to get through the performance. In the Chili Peppers' "An Oral/Visual History" book, bassist Flea said "We got an opening slot at the Olympic Auditorium. But Anthony in all his junkie splendor did not show up. Keith Morris from the Circle Jerks said 'I'll sing' and so we went out with him. We were just playing the songs and he would yell out stuff - whatever he could."

As of 2014, the group has released three studio albums. In July 2021, Off! released their first new song in seven years, a cover of Metallica's “Holier than Thou.” The song is on The Metallica Blacklist covers album that was released on September 10, 2021. Off! also announced that they are working on a new album and a sci-fi feature film.

FLAG
In 2013, Keith Morris, Chuck Dukowski, Dez Cadena, Bill Stevenson and Descendents member Stephen Egerton, created FLAG as an offshoot of Black Flag. As of now, they are only touring. No plans for an album have been announced.

Other works
After the Circle Jerks' first break-up in 1990, Morris led the bands Bug Lamp and Midget Handjob. He also provided backing vocals on "Operation Rescue", from Bad Religion's album Against the Grain (1990).

Morris also narrated Chris Fuller's 2007 Gotham Award-nominated independent film Loren Cass.

Morris appeared as the DJ for the West Coast Punk Rock station Channel X in the video game Grand Theft Auto V released on September 17, 2013

In 2016, Morris released an autobiography called My Damage: The Story of a Punk Rock Survivor.

Personal life
In 1999, Morris was diagnosed with adult onset diabetes. He has also been sober since the 1980s.

On April 13, 2022, it was revealed on the Circle Jerks' Facebook page that Morris had contracted and was recovering from COVID-19.

Discography

With Black Flag
 Nervous Breakdown (1979)
 Tracks 1-9 Everything Went Black (1982)

With Circle Jerks

 Group Sex (1980)
 Wild in the Streets (1982)
 Golden Shower of Hits (1983)
 Wonderful (1985)
 VI (1987)
 Gig (1992)
 Oddities, Abnormalities and Curiosities (1995)

With Bug Lamp
 "Howling at the Moon (Sha-La-La)" on Gabba Gabba Hey: A Tribute to the Ramones (1991)
 "El Dorado" on Roadside Prophets soundtrack (1992)
 "The Ballad of Dwight Fry" on Welcome to Our Nightmare: A Tribute to Alice Cooper (1993)

With Midget Handjob
 Midnight Snack Break at the Poodle Factory (2000)

With Off!
 1st EP (2010)
 First Four EPs (2010)
 "Compared to What" (2011)
 Live at Generation Records (2011)
 Sugar Daddy Live Split Series Vol. 3 (split with the Taylor's) (2012)
 Off! (2012)
 The Music of Grand Theft Auto V ("What's Next) (2013)
 Live at 9:30 Club (2013)
 Wasted Years (2014)
 "Learn to Obey" (2014)
 Live From the BBC (2015)
 The Metallica Blacklist  ("Holier than Thou") (2021)
 Free LSD (2022)

Guest appearances

References
Footnotes

Bibliography

External links
 

1955 births
Living people
American male singer-songwriters
American punk rock singers
People from Hermosa Beach, California
American rock songwriters
Hardcore punk musicians
Black Flag (band) members
Circle Jerks members
Rollins Band members
Off! members
Singer-songwriters from California